This is a list of communities in Richmond County, Nova Scotia.

Communities are ordered by the highway upon which they are located.  All routes start with the terminus located near the largest community.

Arterial Highways

Highway 104: Lower River Inhabitants, Evanston, Walkerville, Grande Anse, Louisdale, Thibeauville, Cannes.

Trunk Routes

Trunk 4:  Cleveland - Kempt Road -  Grande Anse - St. Peter's - Barra Head - Chapel Island - Soldier's Cove - McNab's Cove - Hay Cove - Red Islands- Johnstown - Irish Cove

Collector Roads

Route 206: Arichat - West Arichat
Route 247: L'Ardoise - Grande Greve- Point Michaud
Route 320: Arichat - D'Escousse - Lennox Passage - Grande Anse
Route 327: Forchu

Communities located on rural roads

Cape Auguet
Cape George
Dundee
Evanston
Framboise
French Cove
Grandique Ferry
Grantville
Head of Loch Lomond
Hureauville
Janvrin Island Peninsula
Lake Uist
L'Archeveque
Little Anse
Loch Lomond
Louisdale
Lower River Inhabitants
Lower St Espirit
Port Malcolm
Petit-de-Grat
River Bourgeois
Salmon River
Samson's Cove
Sporting Mountain
St. Esprit
St. George's Channel
Walkerville
West Bay
Whiteside

See also

Richmond County, Nova Scotia